The Yelahanka Air Force Station is an Indian Air Force airfield in Yelahanka, Bengaluru.  The main role of this airfield is to train pilots to fly transport planes. This station also conducts type-conversion of navigators on the Antonov An-32.

The station undertakes logistics support tasks allotted by Air HQs and HQ TC. Every two odd years, Aero India, a biennial air show takes place at Yelahanka air force station. Since 2013, Mi-8, An-32 and Dornier planes are positioned at AFS Yelahanka. It had formerly hosted HAL Tejas aircraft squadron, before it was moved to Sulur Airforce Station. It is 22 km from Bengaluru city railway station.

History

The site was formerly RAF Yelahanka, the following units were here at some point:

See also
List of Indian Air Force Bases

References

Citations

Bibliography

Airports in Bangalore
Airports in Karnataka
Indian Air Force bases
Buildings and structures in Bangalore Urban district
Transport in Bangalore Urban district
World War II sites in India
Airports with year of establishment missing